Philip J. Carr (born 1966) is an American anthropologist and Chief Calvin McGhee Endowed Professor of Native American Studies at the University of South Alabama.
He is known for his works on North American prehistory.

Books
 Contemporary Lithic Analysis in the Southeast: Problems, Solutions, and Interpretations. The University of Alabama Press
 Signs of Power: The Rise of Cultural Complexity in the Southeast. The University of Alabama Pres

References 

Date of birth missing (living people)
Living people
University of South Alabama faculty
American anthropologists
University of Tennessee alumni
University of Louisville alumni
1966 births
American archaeologists